The 2001 Copa América Final was the final match of the 2001 Copa América. It was held on 29 July 2001 in Bogotá. Colombia won the match 1–0 against Mexico, becoming the seventh of sixteen participant countries to win the Copa América.

Match details

|

|}

Assistant referees:
Miguel Giacomuzzi (Paraguay)
Claudio Rossi (Argentina)

References

External links
Copa América 2001; RSSSF.com
Copa America 2001 Final; worldfootball.net
Copa America 2001 Final; football-lineups.com

Final, 2001 Copa America
Colombia national football team matches
Mexico national football team matches
2001–02 in Mexican football
2001 in Colombian football
Copa América finals
21st century in Bogotá
Sports competitions in Bogotá
July 2001 sports events in South America